The 2018–19 Rink Hockey European Female League is the 13th season of Europe's premier female club roller hockey competition organized by CERH.

Format
Fourteen teams joined the first round while title holders Gijón and another team by luck of the draw, got a wildcard for the quarterfinals.

Teams 
Fourteen teams from five federations joined the competition.

Results

Preliminary round
The first leg was played on 10 November and the second leg on 1 December 2018. Montreux got a wildcard for the quarterfinals.

|}

Quarterfinals
The first leg was played on 12 January 2019 and the second leg on 18 February 2019.

|}

See also
2018–19 CERH European League
2018–19 CERS Cup
 World Skate Europe - all competitions

References

External links
 

Rink Hockey European Female League
CERH
CERH